Florian Havemann (born 12 January 1952 in East Berlin) is the son of East German dissident Robert Havemann.

Biography
He is a German writer, painter and composer. He is also a judge at the State Constitutional Court of Brandenburg.

He fled to West Germany during the Cold War and was the subject of the song "Enfant perdu" ("Lost child") by Wolf Biermann. In the song, Biermann mocked Havemann for fleeing East Germany and thus deserting socialism.

Sources 
 Website von Florian Havemann (not updated since 2002)
 Biografische Daten beim Landesverfassungsgericht Brandenburg
 Zeitschrift für unfertige Gedanken
 F.A.Z.-Artikel über das Buch "Havemann" vom 25. Jan. 2008
Schreiattacken gegen Papas Erbe

1952 births
Living people
Musicians from Berlin
People from East Berlin
21st-century German judges
20th-century German painters
20th-century German male artists
German male painters
21st-century German painters
21st-century German male artists
German composers
East German defectors
East German emigrants to West Germany
German male writers